The Mohican River is a principal tributary of the Walhonding River, about  long, in north-central Ohio in the United States.

It then flows generally south-southeast through western Holmes and northeastern Knox Counties, past the community of Brinkhaven, into northwestern Coshocton County, where it joins the Kokosing River to form the Walhonding River. It collects the Lake Fork in Holmes County.

Near Brinkhaven the river is spanned by the Bridge of Dreams, the second longest covered bridge in Ohio.

Variant names and spellings
The river was named after the Mohican Indian tribe. According to the Geographic Names Information System, the Mohican River has also been known historically as:
 Margrets Creek
 Mohecan Creek
 Mohiccan Creek
 Mohiccan John Creek
 Mohiccon Creek
 Mohickan Creek
 Mohickin Johns River

See also
 List of rivers of Ohio

References

Rivers of Ohio
Rivers of Ashland County, Ohio
Rivers of Coshocton County, Ohio
Rivers of Holmes County, Ohio
Rivers of Knox County, Ohio